The 2006 NCAA Division II Men's Soccer Championship was the 35th annual tournament held by the NCAA to determine the top men's Division II college soccer program in the United States. Thirty-two teams participated in the tournament.

The Dowling Golden Lions defeated Fort Lewis, 1–0, at the DII Championship Festival, held in Pensacola, Florida. Morten Jensen scored the match's lone goal in the 38th minute to give the Golden Lions the school's first national title.

Dowling, who finished the season 22-0-2, were coached by John Dirico.

Brackets

Pool 1

Pool 2

Final

See also  
 NCAA Division I Men's Soccer Championship
 NCAA Division III Men's Soccer Championship
 NAIA Men's Soccer Championship

References

NCAA Division II Men's Soccer Championship
NCAA Division II Mens Soccer
NCAA Division II Mens Soccer
NCAA Division II Men's Soccer Championship
Soccer in Florida